State Route 216 (SR 216) is a short state route in the U.S. state of Maine. It runs from Head Beach Road to SR 209 in the town of Phippsburg.

Junction list

References

External links

Floodgap Roadgap's RoadsAroundME: Maine State Route 216

216
Transportation in Sagadahoc County, Maine